The Independent Labor Party (PIT) is a small, predominantly ethnic Tutsi political party in Burundi.

Labour parties
Political parties in Burundi